Diplopeltis, commonly known as pepperflower,  is a genus of flowering plants in the family Sapindaceae. Species include:
Diplopeltis eriocarpa (Benth.) Hemsl. - hairy pepperflower
Diplopeltis huegelii Endl.
Diplopeltis intermedia A.S.George 
Diplopeltis petiolaris Benth.
Diplopeltis stuartii F.Muell. - desert pepperflower

References

Sapindaceae genera
Dodonaeoideae